Yangjia Michuan Taiji Quan, the Yang Family Secret Tradition is a t'ai chi ch'uan style created by Yang Luchan, founder of the Yang style. He passed this special style to his son Yang Chien-hou who transmitted it to his student Zhang Qinlin. Master Wang Yen-nien was taught the Yangjia Michuan by Zhang Qinlin and chose, in order to avoid the disappearance of this style, to teach it to a great number of students all over the world.

The Yangjia Michuan form has 127 movements, divided in three duan.
Tuishou (push hands) and martial applications of the movements of the form have a central importance in this style.

External links
 Yangjia Michuan Taijiquan International, Taipei
 American Yangjia Michuan Taijiquan Association 
 Taiwan Yangjia Michuan Taiji Quan Association
 l'Amicale du Yangjia Michuan en Europe
 le Collège Européen des enseignants du Yangjia Michuan Taiji Quan
 Premier Duan par Georges C. Lin
 Great River Taoist Centre Australia, Yangjia Michuan Taijiquan in Sydney, Australia.

Tai chi styles
Neijia